Leontodon tuberosus is a species of plant in the family Asteraceae.

Sources

References 

tuberosus
Flora of Malta